Venom & Tears is the fifth studio album by American metal band Throwdown, released on August 7, 2007. The album was featured in Best Buy's weekly circular prior to its release. The track "Holy Roller" was released as a single.

The album insert has two holes on the neck of the pictured female in the place of the two fang wounds on the album cover.

Track listing
All lyrics written by Dave Peters and all music composed by Throwdown.

 "Holy Roller" – 4:48
 "Day of the Dog" – 5:07
 "S.C.U.M." – 3:21
 "Americana" – 4:33
 "Weight of the World" – 2:46
 "Cancer" – 2:03 (instrumental)
 "Hellbent (On War)" – 2:39
 "No Love" – 4:31
 "Venom & Tears" – 5:03
 "I'll Never Die a Poisoned Death" – 4:29
 "I, Suicide" – 3:37
 "Godspeed" – 5:58
 "Propaganda" – 3:35

Track 13 is a Sepultura cover, only available on the Japanese, European, Australian, New Zealand and iTunes editions.

Track appearances
"Americana" was released with a cover of Crowbar's "Planets Collide" as a digital EP exclusive to iTunes prior to the album's release.
"I, Suicide" appears on the soundtrack to the film Resident Evil: Extinction.

Personnel 
 Dave Peters – vocals
 Mark Choiniere – guitar
 Matt Mentley – bass
 Ben Dussault – drums
 Ryan Clark – design
 Al Fujisaki – engineer, mixing
 Josh Grabelle – A&R
 Jeff Gros – photography
 Jim Miner – tattoo art
 Dave Schultz – mastering

References 

Throwdown (band) albums
2007 albums
Trustkill Records albums